Efşan Geçgin (born 26 January 1992) is a Turkish professional footballer. He plays as a defender for Etimesgut Belediyespor.

Career
Tosun began his career at the Gençlerbirliği Youth Academy in 2002.

İleri is also a youth international.

References

External links

1992 births
People from Keçiören
Footballers from Ankara
Living people
Turkish footballers
Turkey youth international footballers
Association football defenders
Gençlerbirliği S.K. footballers
Hacettepe S.K. footballers
Aydınspor footballers
Sakaryaspor footballers
Ankara Demirspor footballers
Turgutluspor footballers
Süper Lig players
TFF Second League players
TFF Third League players